William Robert "Red" Alford (July 21, 1937 – May 29, 2003) was an American mathematician who worked in the fields of topology and number theory.

Biography
Born in Canton, Mississippi, he was a United States Air Force veteran. He earned his Bachelor of Science in mathematics and physics from The Citadel (1959), his Ph.D in mathematics from Tulane University (1963), and his J.D. from the University of Georgia School of Law (1976) in Athens, Georgia. After earning his J.D. he practiced law in Athens, before returning to the mathematics faculty. He retired in 2002. He died at 65, after suffering from a brain tumor.

With Andrew Granville and Carl Pomerance, he proved the infinitude of Carmichael numbers in 1994 based on a conjecture given by Paul Erdős.

Although MathSciNet credits him with only eleven publications, two were in Annals of Mathematics, the most prestigious mathematical journal—the Carmichael numbers paper, and a 1970 paper in knot theory.

References

External links

1937 births
2003 deaths
Deaths from brain cancer in the United States
20th-century American mathematicians
21st-century American mathematicians
Number theorists
University of Georgia faculty
University of Georgia alumni
United States Air Force airmen
The Citadel, The Military College of South Carolina alumni
Georgia (U.S. state) lawyers
Mathematicians from Mississippi
Mathematicians from Georgia (U.S. state)
20th-century American lawyers